Kristie Lynn Smith (born 7 August 1988) is an Australian professional golfer who plays on the Futures Tour and the Ladies European Tour.

She was the 2008 Australian Amateur Champion and was the low amateur in the 2008 MFS Women's Australian Open at Kingston Heath Golf Club, finishing at 1 under par in equal 5th place.

Smith turned pro at the end of 2009, earning playing privileges on the Futures Tour. In December 2009 she also qualified for the Ladies European Tour. She won her first tournament as a professional in January 2010 at the Canberra Ladies Classic on the ALPG Tour. She won her second pro tournament on 11 April 2010 at the Daytona Beach Invitational on the Futures Tour.

Amateur career highlights
2008 North and South Women's Amateur Golf Championship - winner
2008 Australian Women's Amateur - winner
2008 T5th MFS Women's Australian Open - low amateur
2007 MFS Women's Australian Open - T25th
2007 Victorian 72-Hole Stroke Play - winner
2006 World Junior Championship, San Diego - T8
2006 OSSO Oak Tree Junior Championship, Oklahoma - winner
2006 Duke University Junior Championship, North Carolina - winner
2006 Malaysian Women's Open - T5, low amateur
2006 Course record 68 at Moonah Links, Victoria
2006 Australian Junior Championships - 3rd
2005 Aaron Baddeley Junior Championship - winner
2005 Jack Newton International Junior Classic - winner
2005 Western Australia State Amateur Championship - winner (youngest ever)
2005 Burtta Cheney Cup - team member

Professional wins (4)

Futures Tour (2)
2010 (1) Daytona Beach Invitational
2012 (1) Tate & Lyle Players Championship

ALPG Tour (2)
2010 (1) Canberra Ladies Classic
2011 (1) Pegasus New Zealand Women's Open (co-sanctioned with the Ladies European Tour)

Ladies European Tour (1)
2011 (1) Pegasus New Zealand Women's Open (co-sanctioned with the ALPG Tour)

Team appearances
Amateur
Junior Tasman Cup (representing Australia): 2006
Tasman Cup (representing Australia): 2007
Queen Sirikit Cup (representing Australia): 2007, 2008
Gladys Hay Memorial Cup (representing Western Australia): 2005, 2006, 2007

References

External links

Kristie Smith at Oklahoma State University (archived)
Getting to Know Kristie Smith - LET 30 March 2010

Australian female golfers
Oklahoma State University alumni
ALPG Tour golfers
Ladies European Tour golfers
1988 births
Living people